The Meridian Highway Bridge is a bridge that formerly carried U.S. Route 81 across the Missouri River between Nebraska and South Dakota. The Meridian Highway Bridge connects Yankton, South Dakota with rural Cedar County, Nebraska. The Meridian Bridge is a double-deck bridge, with the top level having carried traffic into South Dakota from Nebraska, and the lower level having carried traffic into Nebraska from South Dakota. It was closed to all traffic in 2008, but reopened for use only by pedestrians and bicycles in 2011.

History
The bridge crosses the Missouri River, connecting Yankton, South Dakota to the north with Cedar County, Nebraska to the south. Prior to the construction of the bridge, traffic moved between these two points via a ferry service, started in 1870, and a seasonal pontoon bridge, first installed in 1890. The pontoon bridge was disassembled and rebuilt twice a year, once to float on open water, and once to be placed on solid ice. After a 1915 initiative to build a permanent bridge faltered with the U.S. entrance into World War I, a new effort was started by the Yankton Chamber of Commerce 1919. Though fundraising problems caused a temporary halt in 1922, the new bridge, featuring a movable span to allow for river navigation, was completed during the summer of 1924.

The dedication ceremony was held on October 11, 1924, and the bridge opened as a toll bridge. It was the last link of the Meridian Highway, which became U.S. Route 81, to be completed. It was designed for use by trains on the lower level of the bridge and vehicular traffic on the upper level; a lift mechanism allowed river traffic to pass below. However, trains never used the lower level. In 1953, all tolls were lifted and the two levels were converted to one-way traffic: northbound on the top, southbound on the bottom.
In the 1980s, the lift mechanism and counterweights were removed, and the decorative iron railings on the upper level were replaced by Jersey barricades.

The bridge was added to the National Register of Historic Places in 1993.

On May 9, 2008, a 10-ton gross weight limit was placed on the bridge after an inspection found corrosion on the gusset plates. It was replaced by the Discovery Bridge upon its opening on October 11, 2008, exactly 84 years after the dedication of the Meridian Highway Bridge.

The bridge was used as location for filming a scene of the 2016 film Until Forever.

Present and future use
With completion of the Discovery Bridge, the Meridian Bridge has been converted into a pedestrian/bike trail. The bridge reopened in November 2011 to non-motorized traffic only. A two-block-long pedestrian plaza has been added.

The bridge spans the Missouri National Recreational River, a unit of the National Park Service created under the Wild and Scenic Rivers Act.

See also

 List of crossings of the Missouri River
 Missouri National Recreational River
 List of bridges on the National Register of Historic Places in Nebraska
 List of bridges on the National Register of Historic Places in South Dakota
 National Register of Historic Places listings in Cedar County, Nebraska
 National Register of Historic Places listings in Yankton County, South Dakota
 Discovery Bridge (Yankton)
 List of historic bridges in Nebraska
 Gavins Point Dam

References

External links
 
 Meridian Bridge - Missouri National Recreational River
 Historic Bridges of Nebraska - Meridian Bridge
 Missouri National Recreational River
 City of Yankton, South Dakota

Bridges completed in 1924
Road bridges on the National Register of Historic Places in Nebraska
Road bridges on the National Register of Historic Places in South Dakota
Vertical lift bridges in the United States
Buildings and structures in Cedar County, Nebraska
Double-decker bridges
Buildings and structures in Yankton, South Dakota
Pedestrian bridges in the United States
Pedestrian bridges in Nebraska
Former road bridges in the United States
U.S. Route 81
Drawbridges on the National Register of Historic Places
Former toll bridges in Nebraska
Former toll bridges in South Dakota
National Register of Historic Places in Cedar County, Nebraska
National Register of Historic Places in Yankton County, South Dakota
Bridges of the United States Numbered Highway System
Towers in South Dakota
Towers in Nebraska
Steel bridges in the United States
1924 establishments in Nebraska
1924 establishments in South Dakota